2013 Asian Formula Renault Series (aka AFR Series) is the 14th season since its being created by FRD back in 2000. The Series bases the races in Zhuhai International Circuit as 4 rounds of races to be held there. For 3 of them, AFR joined Pan Delta Racing Festival and for the season finale, it will be a support race of the Zhuhai 500 km Endurance Race. Moreover, the AFR series will return to Shanghai for this season as the series holds a round of races on May 1–2 at Shanghai International Circuit.

This year's AFR Series will see drivers to be divided in 3 categories – International, Asian and Masters Class. The International Class will include drivers who are the front runners of previous AFR seasons or other national races. Asian Class will consist of the up-and-coming Asian drivers. Meanwhile, Masters Class will be the battlefield for experienced drivers who are 35 or above. The points scoring system is twisted by a bit this year as well, as the championship will count towards the best 8 rounds out of 10. This change shall stimulate the battle for the championship.

Teams and drivers

I = International Class
A = Asian Class
M = Master Class

Race calendar

Championship Winners

References

External links
 The Official Website for AFR Series

Asian Formula Renault Challenge
Asian Formula Renault Challenge
Asian Formula Renault Challenge
Asian Formula Renault